The 2007 Lone Star Grand Prix was the fourth round of the 2007 American Le Mans Series season.  It took place on April 21, 2007.

Official results
Class winners in bold.  Cars failing to complete 70% of winner's distance marked as Not Classified (NC).

Statistics
 Pole Position - #9 Highcroft Racing - 1:01.824
 Fastest Lap - #7 Penske Racing - 1:02.893

External links
  

Lonestar
2007